Dragoneutes is a genus of beetles in the family Cerambycidae, containing the following species:

 Dragoneutes baculus (Gounelle, 1913)
 Dragoneutes obscurus (Guérin-Méneville, 1843)
 Dragoneutes pilosus Monne, 2004

References

Torneutini